Celtis glabrata is a deciduous tree in the genus Celtis, native to parts of eastern Europe and western Asia. Its Turkish common name is dahum.

Description
Celtis glabrata is a large shrub or a small tree.

Range and habitat
Celtis glabrata is known from scattered locations in southeastern Europe and western Asia, including Bulgaria, Romania, North Macedonia, Greece, Ukraine (Crimea), southern Russia, Armenia, Azerbaijan, Georgia, Turkey, Lebanon, and Syria.

It is generally found in dry and rocky areas, including inland cliffs and mountainsides, from sea level up to 900 meters elevation.

References

glabrata
Plants described in 1848
Flora of Southeastern Europe
Flora of Western Asia